Bebakony Sud is a town and commune in western Madagascar. It belongs to the district of Maintirano, which is a part of Melaky Region. The population of the commune was estimated to be approximately 7,000 in 2001 commune census.

Bebakony Sud has a maritime harbour. Only primary schooling is available. The majority 65% of the population of the commune are farmers, while an additional 30% receives their livelihood from raising livestock. The most important crop is rice, while other important products are wheat, seeds of catechu, barley and raffia palm.  Additionally fishing employs 5% of the population.

References and notes 

Populated places in Melaky